The Scout may refer to:

 The Scout (Kansas City, Missouri statue), an iconic statue located in Penn Valley Park in Kansas City, Missouri
The Scout (Portland, Oregon), a copy of sculptor R. Tait McKenzie's The Ideal Scout
 The Scout, a statue commissioned as the South African War Memorial, Brisbane in Queensland, Australia
The Scout (1989 film), an Iranian film
 The Scout (1994 film), an American comedy film
 Buffalo Bill - The Scout, a statue of Buffalo Bill Cody in Cody, Wyoming
 The Scout (train), a passenger train on the Atchison, Topeka and Santa Fe Railway
 The Scout (magazine), an official publication for Boy Scouts from 1908
 The Scout, a character in the video game Team Fortress 2